Oliver Aquino (born April 26, 1989) is a Filipino actor, singer and dancer.

Aquino was a member of ABS-CBN network's circle of homegrown talents called Star Magic and was once a member of the defunct ASAP boy dance group, Animé, along with Rayver Cruz, Rodjun Cruz, John Wayne Sace, Sergio Garcia, Emman Abeleda and Mico Aytona.

In 2013, Aquino portrayed Jericho 'Jec-Jec' Manansala in 2013-14 TV series of Got to Believe

In 2014 he appeared in the film Kasal directed by Joselito Altarejos. Aquino portrayed Lorenz Gabriel in FPJ's Ang Probinsyano from 2015 to 2016.

In 2016, Aquino appeared in another Altarejos-directed film  T.P.O..

Filmography

Television

Film

Awards and nominations

Notes

References

External links

Filipino male television actors
1989 births
Living people
Star Magic personalities